The men's 4 × 100 metres relay event at the 1994 Commonwealth Games was held on 27 and 28 August at the Centennial Stadium in Victoria, British Columbia.

Medalists

* Athletes who competed in heats only and received medals.

Results

Heats

1Sierra Leone had originally qualified for the final, but they were disqualified after Horace Dove-Edwin tested positive for stanozolol that afternoon; The Gambia took their place in the final.

Final

References

Relay
1994